The following is a list of episodes of the Discovery Kids' series Strange Days at Blake Holsey High which premiered on October 5, 2002 and ended on January 28, 2006. A total of 42 episodes were produced spanning 4 seasons.

Series overview

Episodes

Season 1 (2002–2003)

Season 2 (2003–2004)

Season 3 (2004–2005)

Season 4 (2006)

External links
 

Lists of Canadian children's television series episodes
Lists of science fiction television series episodes